The 2016–17 Yale Bulldogs women's basketball team represented Yale University during the 2016–17 NCAA Division I women's basketball season. The Bulldogs, led by second year head coach Allison Guth, played their home games at John J. Lee Amphitheater of the Payne Whitney Gymnasium and are members of the Ivy League. They finished the season 15–12, 6–8 in Ivy League play to finish in  sixth place.

Ivy League changes
This season, the Ivy League will institute conference postseason tournaments. The tournaments will only award the Ivy League automatic bids for the NCAA Division I Men's and Women's Basketball Tournaments; the official conference championships will continue to be awarded based solely on regular-season results. The Ivy League playoff will take place March 11 and 12 at the Palestra in Philadelphia. There will be two semifinal games on the first day with the No. 1 seed playing the No. 4 seed and the No. 2 seed playing the No. 3 seed. The final will be played the next day for the NCAA bid.

Roster

Schedule

|-
!colspan=9 style="background:#00449E; color:#FFFFFF;"| Non-conference regular season

|-
!colspan=9 style="background:#00449E; color:#FFFFFF;"| Ivy League regular season

See also
 2016–17 Yale Bulldogs men's basketball team

References

Yale
Yale Bulldogs women's basketball seasons
Yale Bulldogs
Yale Bulldogs